"Yet Another Movie" is the sixth track, along with "Round and Around" on Pink Floyd's 1987 album, A Momentary Lapse of Reason. It began as an instrumental piece to which words were later added and features soundbites from the films One-Eyed Jacks and Casablanca.

Live
The piece was performed at every show in Pink Floyd's 1987–1989 tours as the fourth piece in the first set of the show (falling between "Learning to Fly" and "Round and Around") and was featured on the live album Delicate Sound of Thunder. The lap steel guitar that appears at the end of the studio version of "Yet Another Movie" was replaced by a normal guitar solo played at a lower octave on the live performances of the track. On Delicate Sound of Thunder and the 2011 remaster of A Momentary Lapse of Reason, the band separated "Yet Another Movie" from "Round and Around" into different tracks.

Personnel
Pink Floyd
David Gilmour – lead and backing vocals, electric guitar
Nick Mason – drums (middle section) 

Additional musicians
Patrick Leonard – synthesizers, programming
Jon Carin – synthesizers, piano
Tony Levin – bass guitar
Jim Keltner – drums
Steve Forman – percussion
John Helliwell - saxophone (intro)

Delicate Sound of Thunder live version:

David Gilmour – lead guitar, lead vocals
Nick Mason – drums
Richard Wright – keyboards

Additional musicians
Jon Carin – keyboards, backing vocals
Guy Pratt – bass guitar
Tim Renwick – rhythm guitar, backing vocals
Gary Wallis – percussion

References

External links

1987 songs
Pink Floyd songs
Hard rock ballads
Songs written by David Gilmour
Song recordings produced by Bob Ezrin
Song recordings produced by David Gilmour
1980s ballads